Group D of the 2002 Fed Cup Europe/Africa Zone Group II was one of four pools in the Europe/Africa Zone Group II of the 2002 Fed Cup. Three teams competed in a round robin competition, with the team placings determining where they will be positioned within the play-offs.

Ireland vs. Botswana

Finland vs. Egypt

Ireland vs. Finland

Egypt vs. Botswana

Ireland vs. Egypt

Finland vs. Botswana

See also
Fed Cup structure

References

External links
 Fed Cup website

2002 Fed Cup Europe/Africa Zone